The Engaru Shimbun was a regional daily newspaper, published by Engaru Shimbun Inc. based on Engaru, Hokkaido, Japan. It served the town of Engaru and surrounding communities. It was discontinued on 30 June 2015.

History 
The Engaru Shimbun (lit. "Engaru News") was founded in 1946 as Hokutō Mimpō and Takuhoku Shimbun. On 20 July 1976, Hokutō Mimpō and Nikkan Takuhoku merged to form the Engaru Shimbun.

Hokutō Mimpō (lit. "Northeast People's News") was founded on 10 January 1946 by Gunichi Terado who managed printing company at Engaru. At first, it was published every ten days. It was changed daily newspaper in 1960.

Nikkan Takuhoku was founded in September 1946 or 1947 as Takuhoku Shimbun (lit. "North Pioneer News") by Sadashichi Kobayashi. Takuhoku Shimbun was published every ten days. In 1950, the paper was changed weekly paper as Takuhoku Shimpō. In 1957, it began daily publishing as Nikkan Takuhoku (lit. "Daily North Pioneer").

References

   (100 years history of Engaru town) Engaru town hall, August 1998.
   (Prange Collection newspapers catalog - Related to the Hokkaido) Hokkaido Prefectural Library, December 2005.
   (The location catalog of regional newspapers in Hokkaido - 2nd revised edition) Hokkaido Prefectural Library, March 2009.

1946 establishments in Japan
2015 disestablishments in Japan
Defunct newspapers published in Japan
Japanese-language newspapers
Daily newspapers published in Japan
Newspapers established in 1946
Publications disestablished in 2015